Shadow Cabinet of Bill English may refer to the following in New Zealand politics:

 First Shadow Cabinet of Bill English, 2001–2003
 Second Shadow Cabinet of Bill English, 2017–2018

New Zealand National Party
English, Bill